Abhimanyupur is a village in Kurukshetra district of Haryana, India. This village is 8 kilometres from the city of Kurukshetra. This village is famous for being the site where Abhimanyu, the son of Arjuna, died in the Mahabharata War. This is the site where the Kauravas arranged the deadly "chakravyuha" formation and trapped and killed Abhimanyu. This village is part of the 48 kos parikrama of Kurukshetra. This village has many sacred places associated with Hinduism.

Background

Eymology 

The village used to be called Amin, which was most likely a version of the word "Abhimanyu". In October 2019, Haryana Chief Minister Manohar Lal Khattar visited the Amin village as part of his plans to develop an organized tourism circuit of the 48 kos parikrama of Kurukshetra.<ref name=ab1>{{Cite web|title=Village renamed after Mahabharatas Abhimanyu|url=https://www.tribuneindia.com/news/haryana/archive/village-renamed-after-mahabharatas-abhimanyu-481724|last=Service|first=Tribune News|website=Tribuneindia News Service|language=en|access-date=2020-05-13}}</ref> During his visit, Manohar Lal Khattar renamed Amin to Abhimanyupur after Mahabharta era Abhimanyu. 

 History 

In October 2019, Haryana Chief minister, Manohar Lal Khattar, included Abhimanyupur included in the Indian government's Krishna Tourism Circuit development project under which the site and village will be developed for tourism and amenities for the villagers. He instructed the Kurukshetra Development Board to develop an Abhimanyu Park, widen the road to Abhimanyupur, and build basic amenities like toilets and water facilities in Abhimanyupur and surrounding areas. 

 Mahabharat era sites 

 Archaeological mound 

 Chakravyuha and Abhimanyu ka tila 

Abhimanyu ka tila or Abhimanyupur Fort is a 10-meter high 650x250m unexcavated archaeological mound at Amin (Abhimanyupur) in Kurukshetra in Haryana. It is popularly also known as Abhimanyukhera. It is believed to be the site of famous Chakravyuha, arranged by the Kauravas to fight Mahabharata war with Pandavas in which Abhimanyu, the son of Arjuna, was trapped in this Chakravyuha and killed.

Excavations and finds 

The mound remains unexcavated. Two inscribed red sandstone pillars decorated with reliefs of Yaksha and other motifs belonging to 2nd century BC Ewere found here, which are presently are displayed in the Sculpture Gallery at National Museum, New Delhi. In second century BCE, this area was under Maurya Empire till 185 BCE and thereafter Indo-Greek Kingdom.

Abhimanyu park 

Abhimanyu Park is being developed by Kurukshetra Development Board. The park, developed on 8-acre land in the village, will house Abhimanyu statute and Chakravyūha formation.

Abhimanyu statute 

A 18-ft tall statue of Abhimanyu, with a chariot wheel carried in both hands above his head depicting his stance during the Chakravyūha battle of mahabharta war, is installed at Abhimanyupur at the place where he was killed. It is installed by the Kurukshetra Development Board at a cost of Rs 24 lakh in 2020.Kurukshetra to have 4 bronze statues, The Tribune,23 Oct 2020.

Chakravyūha formation 

A Chakravyūha'' formation will be developed in the park (as per 2020 update).

Wetlands and temples

Aditi wetland and temple 

Aditi Kund and Aditi Temple: There is a sacred "kund" (water tank) in Abhimanyupur. It is said that the goddess Aditi gave birth to Surya deva (the Sun God in Hinduism) here. There is also a small temple here.

Surya wetland and temple 

Abhimanyupur Surya Kund and Surya Temple: Next to the Aditi Kund and temple are a small kund and temple dedicated to Surya. Villagers generally deposit the "asthi kalash" (mortal remains) of dead people in the Surya Kund. It is said that if any pregnant lady takes a bath in this holy kund and worships at the Aditi Temple, the male child will be brave.

Modern amenities

There is a Haryana Government veterinary hospital to cater to the needs of the village people for quite some time. There is a school that provides education until senior secondary level. There is a stadium in the name of Mr. Sunil Chauhan. The village also has a pond that is used for pisciculture.

The village has its own Mobile App which is developed by a Software Engineer of this village Mr. Rikki Chouhan. and anyone can download it from Google Play Store for free. Click to open the app in Google Play Store.

See also  

 Administrative divisions of Haryana
 History of Haryana
 Outline of Haryana
 48 kos parikrama of Kurukshetra. This

References

Villages in Kurukshetra district
Places in the Mahabharata
48 kos parikrama of Kurukshetra